Nidularium campo-alegrense is a plant species in the genus Nidularium. This species is endemic to Brazil.

References

campo-alegrense
Flora of Brazil